Gender segregation in Islamic law, custom, law and traditions refers to the practices and requirements in Islamic countries and communities for the separation of men and boys from women and girls in social and other settings.

Views

There have been fatwas which forbid free mixing between men and women (known as Ikhtilat), when alone. The objective of the restrictions is to keep such interaction at a modest level. According to some, men are not permitted to touch any part of the body of the women, whether she is Muslim or non-Muslim. Others have ruled that Muslim men and women who are not immediate relatives may not, for instance, socialize in order to know each other with a handshake and any form of contact which involves physical contact.

A number of Muslim intellectuals and Muslim scholars have challenged this view and claim that certain physical contact is permissible as long as there is no obscenity, inappropriate touching (other than a simple handshake), secret meetings or flirting, according to the general rules of interaction between the genders.

In some parts of the Muslim world, preventing women from being seen by men is closely linked to the concept of Namus. Namus is an ethical category, a virtue, in Middle Eastern Muslim patriarchal character. It is a strongly gender-specific category of relations within a family described in terms of honor, attention, respect/respectability, and modesty. The term is often translated as "honor".

Sources

The Qur'anic verses which address the interaction of men and women in the social context include:

However he forbade men from stopping their wives from going to the Mosque:

Early Islam

Umayyad and Abbasid caliphates 
The roots of gender segregation in Islam have been investigated by many historians. Leila Ahmed explained that the harem arose in the Umayyad and Abbasid dynasties. It was not an institution from the time and place of Prophet Muhammad. Leor Halevi wrote in an article about women and mourning laments that a ″novel and unprecedented concern with the segregation of the sexes″ took place in Kufa, Iraq, in the eighth century. In time, this became normative. Everett K. Rowson discovered that gender nonconforming men in eighth century Medina could move freely between the sexes. Known as Mukhannath, these men were freely able to move between men and women due to beliefs that they were not sexually attracted to women. This changed during the times of the Early Caliphs in order to further keep women in private.

Ottoman Empire

The Harem 
The Ottoman Empire kept genders segregated in the harems and concubines were not allowed to leave the harem. Men, aside from the male head of the household, were forbidden to enter the harem. However, eunuchs were allowed to move freely inside and outside the harem and acted as protectors of the women. This position gave eunuchs the ability to have access to the ruler's living quarters. A common consequence of this segregation of the ruler from the rest of the house, while in the harem, gave eunuchs the role of message bearers. During the course of the Harem racial segregation became common between eunuchs. Slave traders of white circassian slaves enjoyed more business clout due to the inflated value of whiteness that existed during the Ottoman Empire.

Bathhouses 
Segregation between men and women was strictly enforced in 18th-century Ottoman bathhouses. The rules on bathhouse segregation also restricted Muslim women from sharing a bathhouse with non-Muslim women, while Muslim men could share bathhouses with non-Muslim men. Shari'a courts held this up to preserve Muslim women's sanctity and prevent their violation.

In Islamic countries

Afghanistan

Afghanistan, under Taliban religious leadership, was characterized by feminist groups and others as a "gender apartheid" system where women are segregated from men in public and do not enjoy legal equality or equal access to employment or education. In Islam women have the right to equal access to employment and education, although their first priority should be that of the family. Men too are said to be actively involved in the child rearing and household chores. Muhammad helped his wives in the house.

During Islamic Republic of Afghanistan (2004-2021), a huge number of Afghan men didn't have any contact with females other than their own family until going to university. This caused men to not see women as their colleagues thus usually tended to show impolite behaviour from themselves. So that each day thousands of women suffered from insults in streets all over Afghanistan. During this period, gender segregation in Afghanistan’s schools forced the strained Ministry of Education, which was already short on supplies, funding, and teachers, to recreate the system for each gender.

Baghe-Sharara (Persian: باغ شهرآرا) was a women-only park in Kabul during Islamic Republic of Afghanistan. It is the ancient garden constructed by Babur. No men was allowed to enter because it was a women-only space. This garden was reconstructed by financial supports from US, Italy and Switzerland and yearly, on March 8, programs specific to women were held there. As well as, women specific markets were held inside the garden. There were English and sewing classes. The shops selling products, the counselling center, the classes etc were all run by women.

Immediately after 2021 Taliban offensive all universities became sex-segregated all over the country. Since March 2022, Taliban started to segregate all amusement parks and resorts by sex. Ministry for the Propagation of Virtue and the Prevention of Vice (Afghanistan) stated that in Kabul males can go to amusement parks on Wednesdays, Thursdays, Fridays and Saturdays while females can go to amusement parks on Sundays, Mondays and Tuesdays. This ministry added no one is allowed to complain emphasizing that men are not allowed to enter parks on women's days.

Egypt 
During the mid 20th century movements in Egypt implemented laws regarding the public sex segregation. This included the segregation of women on trains, organized by the Muslim Brotherhood. Before this new era, gender segregation was only applied to areas of religious ceremony.

The idea of a “Pink taxi” in Egypt emerged after numerous women demanded women-only cabs. Advocates of the idea claimed that the taxis would help shield women against possible harassment and sexual assault.

Iran

When Ruhollah Khomeini called for women to attend public demonstrations and ignore the night curfew, millions of women who would otherwise not have left their homes without their husbands' and fathers' permission or presence, took to the streets. After the Islamic revolution, however, Khomeini publicly announced his disapproval of mixing between the sexes. During Khomeini's rule limits would be placed on what jobs a woman could possess, these laws would also uphold gender segregation in the workplace. Many women would not be given access into positions of political power without ties to male political elites or have ties with religious leaders, movements, or activism. Prevention of women candidates is upheld by male-dominated political parties who have rejected women from being represented as their possible recommended candidates. All women who have run as candidates for president have been rejected with no reason given.

Critics have argued that the restriction of women's rights under Islamic law has led to the segregation of public and private spaces, which they must then attempt to resolve through politics and creating their own spaces. Gender segregation also impacts the company that people keep, as researcher Ziba Mir-Hosseini noted that during her field work she spent most of her time around women and that in some instances she never met the male relatives of some of these women due to the strict regulation of gender segregation. These restrictions may also impact travel, as some rules state that married women are forbidden from traveling without their husband's permission and in some cases women must be segregated from male passengers. Since 2005 access to higher education has been put off by the Iranian government. In pre-college level education gender segregation has conflicted with religious laws. Article 13 of the Islamic Republic of Iran allows Christians, Jews, and Zoroastrians to educate their followers however their religion instructs them to. Regardless of this law boys and girls have been segregated from being in the same class room. Boys and girls would also get different textbooks. These regulations on gender have moved the ceremonies and events of religious minorities, such as funerals and weddings, out of view from the public due to laws against the public mixture of sexes.

Iraq
Gender-isolated education is conducted through higher-education, due to religious ideas of sex segregation. Hotels and motels all have strict rules for sex segregation.

Saudi Arabia

In Saudi Arabia, male doctors were previously not allowed to treat female patients, unless there were no female specialists available; and it was also not permissible for women to treat men. This has changed, however, and it is not uncommon for men and women to visit doctors of the opposite sex.

Critics have argued that the restriction of women's rights under Saudi Arabia law, which is based on sharia law, has led to the separation of gender as women and men are separated in almost all areas, from women-only fast food lines to women-only offices. These laws and policies are enforced by the Islamic religious police, which has prompted some to find ways to evade policing. Gender segregation also impacts the Saudi education system, as there are more opportunities for men to graduate with a career and find employment. Women do not share in these opportunities and have a more difficult time finding employment as there are only a small number of locations that permit men and women to mix. Gender segregation also impacts the participation of women in religion by encouraging women to pray at home and not in the mosque. Scholars have stated that despite these restrictions, changes brought about with the new generations have allowed women more freedom to choose whether they pray at the mosque or in their homes.

Mandate Palestine
Of the late 19th and early 20th century European Jewish immigration to Palestine, Norman Rose writes that secular "Zionist mores" were "often at odds with Arab convention, threatening the customs and moral assumptions that lent cohesion to a socially conservative, traditional Palestinian society." The active political role of the women of the Yishuv, and their lack of segregation, was judged as particularly offensive.

United States
In the United States, Muslim couples may opt for gender-separate wedding celebrations so that men and women sit separately during the ceremony and celebrate in different rooms. Men and women, who are guests, do not sit together at the wedding ceremony, because it is seen as a ‘time out’ from the usual mixing of the sexes.

In mosques

Some schools of thought say that women should be encouraged to pray at home rather than in a mosque. However, other schools prefer to look at the context of the sayings, which they suggest were given at a time when women were in danger when leaving their homes, and consider mosques as welcome for women as their homes. Muhammad did not forbid women from entering his mosque in Medina. In fact, he told Muslims "not to prevent their women from going to mosque when they ask for permission".

Prophet Muhammad specifically admonished the men not to keep their wives from going to the mosques:

Segregation of sexes in mosques and prayer spaces is reported in a hadith in Sahih Muslim, one of the two most authentic Hadith books in Islam. It says that the best rows for men are the first rows, and the worst ones the last ones, and the best rows for women are the last ones and the worst ones for them are the first ones.

It is also recorded that Muhammad ordered that mosques have separate doors for women and men so that men and women would not be obliged to go and come through the same door. He also commanded that after the Isha' evening prayer, women be allowed to leave the mosque first so that they would not have to mix with men.

After Muhammad's death, many of his followers began to forbid women under their control from going to the mosque. Aisha bint Abi Bakr, a wife of Muhammad, once said, "If the Prophet had lived now and if he saw what we see of women today, he would have forbidden women to go to the mosque even as the Children of Israel forbade their women."

The second caliph Umar also prohibited women from attending mosques especially at night because he feared they may be occasions of teasing by men so he asked them to pray at home.

As Islam spread, it became unusual for women to worship in mosques because of male fear of immorality between sexes.

Sometimes a special part of the mosque was railed off for women. For example, the governor of Mecca in 870 had ropes tied between the columns to make a separate place for women.

Many mosques today put the women behind a barrier or partition or in another room. Mosques in South and Southeast Asia put men and women in separate rooms, as the divisions were built into them centuries ago. In nearly two-thirds of American mosques, women pray behind partitions or in separate areas, not in the main prayer hall; some mosques do not admit women at all due to the "lack of space" and the fact that some prayers, such as the Friday Jumuʻah, are mandatory for men but optional for women. Although there are sections exclusively for women and children, the Grand Mosque in Mecca is desegregated.

There is a growing women's movement led by figures such as Asra Nomani who protest against what they regard as their second-class status and facilities.

Justifications for segregation include the need to avoid distraction during prayer, although the primary reason cited is that this was the tradition (sunnah) of worshipers in the time of Muhammad.

Criticism
British-born Muslim author Ed Husain argues that rather than keeping sexual desires under check, gender segregation creates "pent-up sexual frustration which expressed itself in the unhealthiest ways," and leads young people to "see the opposite gender only as sex objects." While working in Saudi Arabia for seven months as an English teacher, the Arabic-speaking Husain was surprised to find that despite compulsory gender segregation and full hijab, Saudi men were much less modest and more predatory towards women than men in other countries he had lived. Despite the modest dress of his wifewho "out of respect for local custom, ... wore the long black abaya and covered her hair in a black scarf"she was on two occasions "accosted by passing Saudi youths from their cars. ... In supermarkets I only had to be away from [my wife] for five minutes and Saudi men would hiss or whisper obscenities as they walked past." Discussions with local women at the British Council indicated that her experience was far from unique. There is also a strong viewpoint growing among Muslims arguing against gender segregation. In Saudi Arabia which is known to be among the most gender segregated countries in the world there are occasional signs that gender segregation laws are becoming less strict. Some Muslims argue that women served food for the prophet Muhammad and his companions arguing that this is evidence that gender segregation did not exist during the earlier times of Islam.

See also

 Gender separation in Judaism
 Harem
 Women-only park
 Islamic Bill of Rights for Women in the Mosque
 Marriage in Islam
 Namus, virtue, used in a gender-specific way
 Purdah, a physically separate area for women
 Women's mosques
Case studies:
 Sultana's Dream, a 1905 Bengali story of reversed sex segregation
 Golden Needle Sewing School
 Islamofascism
 Mechitza, barrier that separates men and women in Jewish synagogues

References

External links
 Rasoulallah.netentries about Women in Islam
 Sultan.orgIslamic portal dealing with many points related to women in Islam
 Women in the Qur’an, hadith, and fiqh/jurisprudence
 Behind Closed Doors with a GirlShia Perspective on being alone with a member of the opposite gender 
 Shia perspective on shaking hands with opposite gender and exceptions 

Gender and Islam
Islam-related controversies
Islamism
Modesty in Islam
Sex segregation
Sex segregation and Islam
Sexuality and society
Sharia